Osová Bítýška is a municipality and village in Žďár nad Sázavou District in the Vysočina Region of the Czech Republic. It has about 900 inhabitants.

Administrative parts
The village of Osová is an administrative part of Osová Bítýška.

Notable people
Petr Hladík (born 1984), politician

References

Villages in Žďár nad Sázavou District